Quiinaceae Engl. is a neotropical family of flowering plants in the Malpighiales, consisting of about 50 species in 4 genera (Froesia, Lacunaria, Quiina, Touroulia). The APG III system of flowering plant classification does not recognize such a family, instead including these genera in the Ochnaceae family.

References

External links 
 Quiinaceae in L. Watson and M.J. Dallwitz (1992 onwards). The families of flowering plants: descriptions, illustrations, identification, information retrieval. https://web.archive.org/web/20070103200438/http://delta-intkey.com/

Malpighiales families
Historically recognized angiosperm families